The Karadak-Gollak Uprising, variously also known as the armed resistance of Karadak in the southeast of Kosovo 1941–1951, was series of Albanian riots in the Karadak and Gollak regions directed firstly against the Bulgarian, German and Italian occupation which started in 1941 after the Invasion of Yugoslavia and later against the Yugoslav Partisans, who were trying to take over the region.

Background 
Following the April War, the region of Kosovo was divided into three occupation zones, which were defined in the Vienna talks. Axis Powers like Italy and Germany sought to meet the demands of Bulgaria, which was another ally of the Axis Bloc. Bulgaria sought to annex the Karadak region which included parts of the Region of Gjilan, Vitia, Kaçanik, the Presevo Valley, Kumanovo and Skopje. The newly annexed regions contained about 200,000 Albanians. All ethnic Albanian territories annexed by Bulgaria, were declared as an integral part of the Bulgarian Kingdom. During their rule in Kosovo, the Bulgarian Authorities implemented brutal policies against the Albanian Population, which included internment, imprisonment, displacement and killings. By September 1942, 3,000-4,000 Albanians were expelled by the Bulgarian Authorities from their lands. These policies made local Albanians rise to arms and revolt. One of the main rebels was Mulla Idriz Gjilani which headed paramilitary forces in the region to oppose the presence of Bulgarian troops and the return of Serb partisan units.

First phase

Albanian Attacks (1941–1944)

Battle of Lojane Mine 
On 28 September 1942 Bulgarian and Albanian forces fought in the village of Lojane. The Albanian rebels under Xheladin Kurbaliu attacked to capture the mine near the village.

Battle of Velja Glava 

On 28 June 1944, 500-600 Serbian Chetniks attacked the Village Velja Glava of the Gollak Highlands near Kosovska Kamenica, in which they were engaged by Ballist forces from Karadak led by Mulla Idriz Gjilani.

The battle lasted 12 hours and ended with a decisive Albanian victory. According to Albanian sources, the Serbian Chetnik forces had suffered high casualties, with 200 killed and 131 captured, while the Albanian forces only suffered light casualties with 17 losses.

Battle of Kitka 

On 26 July 1944, Serbian Chetniks, numbering 600-800, again began attacking Albanian villages in the Gollak Highlands, more specifically, Svircë and Tugjec near the Kitka mountain. They were again met by Albanian Ballist forces from Karadak led by Mulla Idriz Gjilani and Limon Staneci, which came to defend the villages.

The battle again ended with a decisive Albanian victory, leaving 143 Chetniks killed and 209 wounded, while Albanians suffered no casualties.

Battle of Reka of Rainca 

The Battle of the Reka of Rainca also known as the War for East Kosovo was fought in the southeast region of Gjilan, Preševo, Bujanovac by Ristovc, Tasjan and Brezë in the 29th of August 1944. The battle was fought as a defensive reaction to the attacks of the Serbian and Bulgarian forces on 28 August 1944. The Battle ended with and Albanian victory due to the capitulation and withdrawal of Bulgarian forces on 7 September 1944, the Preševo Valley was occupied shortly after by the forces of the Albanian Kingdom. The elected leader was Limon Staneci, the commander of the gendarmerie was Ali Staneci and the commander of rebel forces was Ibrahim Kelmendi.

Bulgarian capitulation and withdrawal 
Kingdom of Bulgaria  occupied the region until September 7, 1944, when they handed the area over to Nazi Germany. The Albanian collaborationist regime along with Balli Kombëtar and Kachak insurgents subsequently took over most of the region the region including the whole Preševo Valley and the City of Kumanovo and surroundings.

Second phase

Kumanovo and Kosovo Operations 

Bulgaria declared war on Germany on September 8. On 11 November 1944 the Bulgarian Army attacked the city of Kumanovo, where the Wehrmacht and Albanian forces were defeated and the town was captured by the Bulgarian Army. On 19 September 1944 Yugoslav Partisan forces attacked the Preševo Valley. The Albanian Ballists in total had 700-1000 men, which were led by Ramiz Cernica and Hoxhe Lipovica and clashed with the Partisan forces. After several hours of heavy fighting, the Albanian forces were defeated and the entire Preševo Valley was captured by Yugoslav Partisan forces.

Last Ballist Resistance (1944–1951)

Battle of Muçibaba 

The village of Muçibaba was one of the last Ballist strongholds in the region and on 30 November 1944, about 2,000 Yugoslav Partisans from Anamorava, crossed the Binačka Morava river into Karadak, surrounded the village, and demanded the surrender of the Ballist and Kachak forces. Their demanded was not accepted and the Yugoslav Partisans started their Attack.

The Albanian forces in Muçibaba did not exceed 120 and although numerically superior, the partisans had to suffer high casualties after four failed attacks on the village were conducted. The partisans decided to retreat and regroup in the village of Pisjan, not far from Muçibaba. In Pisjan, Partisan forces were joined by Serbian Chetniks from the neighbouring region of Anamorava.

In the evening, the Partisans conducted another attack. During the Battle the commander of the Albanian forces Ymer Myçybaba was wounded and many others were killed. The Partisans, who were attacking the village from three sides, captured the village after Hours of heavy fighting. The wounded commander Ymer Myçybaba managed to escape to the nearby village of Kokaj, but died a few hours later from his wounds. Ahmet Haziri another commander during the Battle also died from the wounds he received during the battle.

Bistrica Ambush 

In early October 1951, the state security service of Yugoslavia (UDBA) planned to liquidate Hasan Remniku and Mustafa Kokaj, the last of the Ballist and Kachak rebel leaders. UDBA agents were sent, posing as people who would help smuggle Kokaj and Remniku across the border into Albania. On October 6 1951 on their way to Albania, the rebel leaders ran into a well prepared ambush set up by Yugoslav forces. Fighting between the Yugoslav and Ballist forces lasted three days, in which Kokaj and Remniku and most of their soldiers were killed.

Aftermath 
Following the quelling of the uprising, Yugoslav forces began targeting the Albanian population in Karadak, Anamorava and Gollak. In all about 1,200 Albanians were massacred by the Yugoslav forces.

References 

Conflicts in 1944
1944 in Albania
Military history of Albania during World War II
Military history of Yugoslavia during World War II
Military history of Bulgaria during World War II
Uprisings during World War II
Yugoslav Partisans
History of Kosovo